Jonathan Glao Tah (born 11 February 1996) is a German professional footballer who plays as a centre back for Bayer Leverkusen and the Germany national team.

Early life 

Tah was born in Hamburg, to an Ivorian father and a German mother. He grew up in the Hamburg-quarter of Altona.

Club career 

Tah started playing football in Altona 93. Then he joined SC Concordia before being snapped up by Hamburger SV. On 4 August 2013, Tah made his competitive debut for Hamburger SV in DFB Cup match against SV Schott Jena. He made his Bundesliga debut on 21 September 2013 in a 2-0 home loss against Werder Bremen.

On 1 September 2014, he was loaned to Fortuna Düsseldorf for one year.

On 15 July 2015 he signed a five-year contract with Bayer Leverkusen. On 26 February 2018, Bayer Leverkusen announced the extension of Tah's contract with the club until 2023. He made his 100th Bundesliga appearance for the club on 10 March 2019.

International career
Tah received his first call up to the senior Germany squad in March 2016 for friendlies against England and Italy. He made his debut in the former, coming on at half time for Mats Hummels in a 2–3 loss. He was called up to replace Antonio Rüdiger at Euro 2016.

Tah was not included in Joachim Löw's final 23-man squad for the 2018 FIFA World Cup.

Career statistics

Club

International

Honours
Germany U21
UEFA European Under-21 Championship runner-up: 2019

Individual
 Fritz Walter Medal U19 Gold: 2015
UEFA Europa League Squad of the Season: 2019–20

References

External links

kicker profile 

1996 births
Living people
German people of Ivorian descent
German sportspeople of African descent
Association football central defenders
German footballers
Altonaer FC von 1893 players
Hamburger SV II players
Hamburger SV players
Fortuna Düsseldorf players
Bayer 04 Leverkusen players
Bundesliga players
2. Bundesliga players
Regionalliga players
Germany youth international footballers
Footballers from Hamburg
Germany under-21 international footballers
Germany international footballers
UEFA Euro 2016 players